Tony Award for Best Costume Design in a Play is an award for outstanding costume design of a play. The award was first presented in 1961 after the category of Best Costume Design was divided into Costume Design in a Play and Costume Design in a Musical with each genre receiving its own award.

Winners and nominees

1960s

2000s

2010s

2020s

Award records

Multiple wins
 3 Wins
 Catherine Zuber

 2 Wins 
 Katrina Lindsay

Multiple nominations
 8 Nominations
 Jane Greenwood

 6 Nominations
 Catherine Zuber

 5 Nominations
 Ann Roth

 3 Nominations
 Rob Howell
 Michael Krass
 Clint Ramos
 David Zinn

 2 Nominations
 Dede Ayite
 Bob Crowley
 Jess Goldstein
 Toni-Leslie James
 Katrina Lindsay
 William Ivey Long
 Santo Loquasto
 Martin Pakledinaz
 Constanza Romero
 Mark Thompson

See also
 Tony Award for Best Costume Design in a Musical
 Drama Desk Award for Outstanding Costume Design of a Play
 Laurence Olivier Award for Best Costume Design

External links
Tony Awards Official site
Tony Awards at Internet Broadway database Listing
Tony Awards at broadwayworld.com

Tony Awards
Awards established in 1961
1961 establishments in New York City